Hayford may refer to the following people: 
 Adelaide Casely-Hayford (1868-1960), Sierra Leonean author and activist
 Harrison Hayford (1916-2001) Melville scholar.
 Jack W. Hayford (born 1934), American pastor
 John Fillmore Hayford (1868–1925), American geodesist
 J. E. Casely Hayford (1866–1930), Fante journalist, author and politician
 J. E. S. de Graft-Hayford (1912–2002), British-born Ghanaian Air Force Commander  
 Justin Hayford (born 1970), American singer, pianist and AIDS activist

Hayford may also refer to the following places: 
 Hayford (crater), on the Moon
 Hayford Park, Bangor, Maine
 Hayford Junction, railroad yard in Chicago, Illinois